Pradhana Vizha is a  television award ceremony held in Singapore by MediaCorp Vasantham. It was started to honour rapidly growing Tamil television artists on Mediacorp Vasantham.

History
Pradhana Vizha first started in 1996 as "Prime 12 Awards" to honor both Malay and Indian artistes, it was later separated into two different award ceremonies. Since then the growth of local Indian television and artistes has helped cultivate Pradhana Vizha, making it a full-fledged annual awards ceremony by 2000, just to coincide with the relaunch of Central with one of its timebelts, Vasantham Central.

Award and winners

2009-2012

2014

See also

 List of Asian television awards

References

Tamil-language television awards
Singaporean television awards
Mediacorp